James Ford Rhodes High School is located in Cleveland, Ohio, United States, in the west-side neighborhood known as Old Brooklyn.  It is part of the Cleveland Metropolitan School District and is commonly referred to as "Rhodes High School."

The school was named for the American industrialist and historian James Ford Rhodes.  Drew Carey, actor and current host of The Price Is Right; Les Horvath, 1944 Heisman Trophy winner; and poet d.a. levy are alumni of Rhodes.

Ohio High School Athletic Association State Championships

 Track and Field - 1994

Gallery

Links
 
 Cleveland Memory Project
 James Ford Rhodes High School available on Cleveland Public Library Digital Gallery, various years 1949 through 2003

Notes and references

High schools in Cuyahoga County, Ohio
Education in Cleveland
Public high schools in Ohio
Cleveland Metropolitan School District